South-Eastern Administrative Okrug, or Yugo-Vostochny Administrative Okrug, is one of the twelve high-level territorial divisions (administrative okrugs) of the federal city of Moscow, Russia. As of the 2010 Census, its population was 1,318,885, up from 1,109,121 recorded during the 2002 Census.

Territorial divisions
The administrative okrug comprises the following twelve districts:
Kapotnya
Kuzminki
Lefortovo
Lyublino
Maryino
Nekrasovka
Nizhegorodsky
Pechatniki
Ryazansky
Tekstilshchiki
Vykhino-Zhulebino
Yuzhnoportovy

References

Notes

Sources

 
Administrative okrugs of Moscow